NVD may refer to:

 Avion Express, Lithuania (ICAO airline code)
 Dutch Zoo Federation
 HD NVD, a High-definition video standard
 National Vulnerability Database
 Night vision device
 Party for Neighbourly Love, Freedom, and Diversity, a Dutch political party with only three known members forced by legal action to use the initials "PNVD" instead of "NVD"
 Normal vaginal delivery